The Lower Rhine (kilometres 660 to 1,033 of the river Rhine) flows from Bonn, Germany, to the North Sea at Hook of Holland, Netherlands (including the Nederrijn or "Nether Rhine" within the Rhine–Meuse–Scheldt delta); alternatively, Lower Rhine may refer to the part upstream of Pannerdens Kop, excluding the Nederrijn.

Almost immediately after entering the Netherlands, the Rhine splits into numerous branches. The main branch is called  the Waal which flows from Nijmegen to meet the Meuse; after which it is called Merwede. Near Rotterdam the river is known as Nieuwe Maas, and becomes the Nieuwe Waterweg flowing into the North Sea at Hook of Holland.
The downstream Lower Rhine is a low lying land. Up to the beginning of industrialization roughly one fifth of the land area could only be used as pasture: an endless meadow, which could not be farmed because of flooding and a high ground-water level. However, the remaining soils of the Lower Rhine were always very fertile. That can also be seen in the farmsteads. The houses are relatively large, with the intention of accommodating a plentiful harvest and many cattle. The Nederrijn refers to the more northern former main branch of the Rhine, which flows past Arnhem; splits off the IJssel which flows into the IJsselmeer and then splits into the Lek  and the Kromme Rijn at Wijk bij Duurstede. The Lek flows into the Merwede. The Kromme Rijn continues past Utrecht, becomes the Leidse Rijn, then Oude Rijn and flows into the North Sea at Katwijk.

There are other minor branches such as the Vecht, Hollandse IJssel and the Noord.

The German term Niederrhein refers both to the German section of the Lower Rhine as well as to parts of the surrounding Lower Rhine region.

See also
Rhineland
Nederrijn
Low Rhenish
Lower Rhine, a French department bordering the Upper Rhine
 Lower Rhine, a Prussian province (1815 to 1822) bordering the Middle Rhine 
Other sections of the Rhine:
Middle Rhine
Upper Rhine
High Rhine
Alpine Rhine

 
Rivers of North Rhine-Westphalia
Rhine, Lower
Rhine
Rivers of Gelderland
Rivers of Utrecht (province)
Rivers of South Holland
Rivers of Overijssel
Rivers of Germany